Milne Bay is a large bay in Milne Bay Province, south-eastern Papua New Guinea. It is surrounded by the heavily wooded Stirling Range to the north and south, and on the northern shore, a narrow coastal strip, soggy with sago and mangrove swamps.
The bay is named after Sir Alexander Milne.

History
 Surveyed by Luis Vaez de Torres in July 1606.
 Surveyed by Captain Owen Stanley, R.N. F.R.S. in 1850.

World War II

During World War II, the area was the site of the Battle of Milne Bay in 1942 and by late 1943 it became the major support base, Naval Base Milne Bay, for the New Guinea campaign through the development of Finschhafen as an advanced base after that area was secured in the Huon Peninsula campaign. By January 1944 about 140 vessels were in harbor due to congestion at the facilities. Congestion was relieved by opening of a port at Finschhafen and extensive improvements at Milne Bay. Malaria was a major problem in New Guinea and Milne Bay was particularly hard hit with incidents of the disease hitting at a rate of 4,000 cases per 1,000 troops per year and estimated 12,000 man-days a month lost time.

There were three planes ditched off the island in 1943, a P-38H Lightning, a P-38F Lightning, and a B-24D Liberator "The Leila Belle" (MIA).

21st Century

The HMPNGS Seeadler fired upon a Vietnamese fishing vessel on December 23, 2016.  Her captain died, and the poacher sank.

See also
Battle of Buna–Gona
Milne Force
Operation Lilliput

Gallery

Footnotes

References

Bays of Papua New Guinea
Geography of Milne Bay Province
Populated places in Milne Bay Province